Cristian Josué Artiles Cedrés (born 24 January 1996) is a Spanish footballer who plays as a left winger.

Club career
Born in Las Palmas, Canary Islands, Cedrés joined Real Madrid's youth setup in 2010, from UD Las Palmas. He made his senior debut with the C-team on 7 September 2014, starting in a 2–3 Tercera División home loss against Fútbol Alcobendas Sport, and scored his first goal the following 4 January, netting his team's second in a 4–2 away defeat of AD Torrejón CF.

On 5 July 2015, Cedrés was promoted to the reserves in Segunda División B by manager Zinedine Zidane. On 26 June 2017, he moved to another reserve team, Villarreal CF B also in the third division.

On 17 July 2018, Cedrés returned to Las Palmas and was assigned to the B-side also in division three. On 27 November, he extended his contract until 2021.

Cedrés made his first team debut on 28 April 2019, starting a 4–1 home routing of CD Lugo in the Segunda División championship. On 17 June, he was definitely promoted to the main squad.

Cedrés subsequently struggled with injuries before terminating his contract with Las Palmas on 31 August 2021.

References

External links
Real Madrid profile

1996 births
Living people
Footballers from Las Palmas
Spanish footballers
Association football wingers
Segunda División players
Segunda División B players
Tercera División players
Real Madrid C footballers
Real Madrid Castilla footballers
Villarreal CF B players
UD Las Palmas Atlético players
UD Las Palmas players
Spain youth international footballers